Leptolalax pyrrhops is a species of frogs in the family Megophryidae.

References

pyrrhops
Amphibians described in 2015
Taxa named by Eduard Artashesovich Galoyan